Nikki Anne Iles  (née Burnham; born 16 May 1963) is a British jazz composer, pianist and educator.

Early life
Iles was born in Dunstable, Bedfordshire, on 16 May 1963. She started her musical education at primary school, where she learnt to play the harmonica and the clarinet, and at eleven years old she won a junior exhibition at the Royal Academy of Music, where she studied clarinet and piano from 1974 to 1981. She became a member of the Bedfordshire Youth Jazz Orchestra. She went on to the Leeds College of Music (1981–1984).

Later life and career
After graduating from the Leeds College of Music, she decided to settle in Yorkshire. After marrying trumpeter Richard Iles, she changed her surname from Burnham. She joined his band Emanon, with which she played some of her compositions. Iles also began playing with several London-based bands, such as those led by Steve Argüelles, Mick Hutton and Stan Sulzmann.

Iles won the 1996 John Dankworth Special Award at the BT Jazz Festival. Following a serious car crash after a gig, Iles opted to settle in London.

Iles is senior lecturer at Middlesex University, and has taught at the University of York, Leeds College of Music, the Guildhall School of Music, and in Bulgaria, Holland, France, and Finland.

Iles was awarded the British Empire Medal (BEM) in the 2022 New Year Honours for services to music.

Discography

As leader/co-leader

As sidewoman
With Anthony Braxton
Composition No. 175 / Composition No. 126: Trillium Dialogues M (Leo, 1994)
With Mike Gibbs
By the Way (Ah Um, 1993)
With Ingrid Laubrock
Some Times (Candid, 1998)
With Tina May
One Fine Day (33Jazz, 1999)
I'll Take Romance (Linn, 2002)
More Than You Know (33Jazz, 2004)
A Wing and a Prayer (33Jazz, 2005–06)
With Sylvan Richardson
Pyrotechnics (Blue Note, 1992)
With Geoff Simkins
Don't Ask (Symbol, 1999)
With Martin Speake
Secret (Basho, 2000)
With Stan Sulzmann
Treasure Trove (ASC, 1995)
With Dick Walter/Jazz Craft Ensemble
Secret Moves (ASC, 1999)

References

External links

21st-century accordionists
21st-century pianists
1963 births
Academics of Middlesex University
Academics of the University of York
Alumni of Leeds College of Music
Alumni of the Royal Academy of Music
Basho Records artists
British accordionists
British jazz pianists
FMR Records artists
Living people
People from Dunstable
Recipients of the British Empire Medal